Ivory Coast, also known as Côte d'Ivoire and officially as the Republic of Côte d'Ivoire, competed at the 2016 Summer Olympics in Rio de Janeiro, Brazil, from 5 to 21 August 2016. This was the nation's fourteenth appearance at the Summer Olympics.

The Ivory Coast National Olympic Committee selected a team of 12 athletes, five men and seven women, to compete in six different sports at these Games, overhauling the roster size set in London 2012 by two athletes. For the fourth time in the nation's Olympic history, Ivory Coast was represented by more female than male athletes.

More than half of the Ivorian roster were rookies at the Games, with archer Philippe Kouassi, taekwondo fighter Ruth Gbagbi, and sprinters Ben Youssef Meïté and Murielle Ahouré, top eight finalist in both 100 and 200 metres, returning for their second appearance from London 2012. As the most experienced member of the team, Ahouré was selected by the committee to carry the Ivorian flag in the opening ceremony.

Ivory Coast left Rio de Janeiro with two Olympic medals, adding them to the silver won by sprinter Gabriel Tiacoh in the men's 400 metres at Los Angeles 1984. These medals were awarded to Gbagbi (women's 67 kg) and fellow taekwondo fighter Cheick Sallah Cissé (men's 80 kg), who emerged himself as the Ivory Coast's first ever Olympic champion.

Medallists

Archery
 
Two Ivorian archers qualified each for both the men's and women's individual recurve by obtaining one of the three Olympic places available from the 2016 African Archery Championships in Windhoek, Namibia. However, the Ivorian National Committee revoked the entry of Carla Frangilli after the final deadline. According to reallocation procedures, the quota was assigned to Greece, and four-time Olympian Evangelia Psarra was selected.

Athletics (track and field)
 
Ivorian athletes have so far achieved qualifying standards in the following athletics events (up to a maximum of 3 athletes in each event):

Track & road events

Fencing

Ivory Coast has entered one fencer into the Olympic competition for the first time. Gbahi-Gwladys Sakoa had received a spare Olympic berth freed up by South Africa, as the next highest-ranked fencer, not yet qualified, in the women's épée at the African Zonal Qualifier in Algiers, Algeria.

Judo

Ivory Coast has qualified one judoka for the women's lightweight category (57 kg) at the Games. Zouleiha Abzetta Dabonne earned a continental quota spot from the African region as highest-ranked Ivorian judoka outside of direct qualifying position in the IJF World Ranking List of May 30, 2016.

Swimming

Ivory Coast has received a Universality invitation from FINA to send two swimmers (one male and one female) to the Olympics.

Taekwondo
 
Ivory Coast entered three athletes into the taekwondo competition at the Olympics. Cheick Sallah Cisse qualified automatically for the men's welterweight category (80 kg) by finishing in the top 6 WTF Olympic rankings. Meanwhile, 2012 Olympian Ruth Gbagbi and debutant Mamina Koné secured the remaining spots on the Ivory Coast team by virtue of their top two finish respectively in the women's welterweight (67 kg) and heavyweight category (+67 kg) at the 2016 African Qualification Tournament in Agadir, Morocco.

References

External links
 
 

Nations at the 2016 Summer Olympics
2016
Olympics